John Levi Martin (born 1964) is an American sociologist and the Florence Borchert Bartling Professor of Sociology at the University of Chicago. He is the author of five books: Thinking Through Statistics, Thinking Through Methods, Thinking Through Theory, Social Structures, The Explanation of Social Action, the latter two of which have both won the Theory Prize for Outstanding Book from the ASA's Theory Section. He has also written data analysis programs such as DAMN (Dyadic Analysis of Multiple Networks) and ELLA (Every-gal-and-guy’s Latent Lattice Analyser).

Early life and education 
Martin studied at Wesleyan University and received a BA in sociology and English in 1987. While there he was influenced by notable political sociologist Herbert Hyman who died in 1985, and Martin received the Herbert Hyman prize for undergraduate sociology for his thesis: The Epistemology of Fundamentalism. He then attended the University of California - Berkeley, where he received a MA in 1990 and a PhD in 1997. His dissertation committee was Ann Swidler (Chair), Mike Hout, James Wiley, John Wilmoth. It was titled Power Structure and Belief Structure in Forty American Communes, and used the Urban Commune Data Set.

Areas of activity 
John Levi Martin's current main areas of interest are field theory, social structures, and party formation.  His previous work has been on classical theory, historical changes in sexual decision making and the economy, the shaping of belief systems, the use of race as a conceptual category in American sociology, the relationship between interpersonal power and attributions of sexiness, methods for the analysis of qualitative data, political psychology, and the division of labor in Busytown.

Selected works
1998: "Structures of Power in Naturally Occurring Communities". - Social Networks. - 20. - pp. 197–225.
1999: "Entropic Measures of Belief System Constraint". - Social Science Research. - 28. - pp. 111–134.
1999: (with James Wiley) - "Algebraic Representations of Beliefs and Attitudes: Partial Order Models for Item Responses". - Sociological Methodology. 29. - pp. 113–146.
1999: "A General Permutation-Based QAP Analysis for Dyadic Data from Multiple Groups". - Connections. - 22. - pp. 50–60.
2002: "Some Algebraic Structures for Diffusion in Social Networks". - Journal of Mathematical Sociology. 26. - pp. 123–146.
2003: "What is Field Theory?". - American Journal of Sociology. 109. - pp. 1–49.
2009: Social Structures. - Princeton University Press.
2011: The Explanation of Social Action. - Oxford University Press.
2018: Thinking Through Statistics. - University of Chicago Press.

References 

 homepage at the University of Chicago
 Social Structures at Princeton University Press 
 Levi Martin's CV

American sociologists
University of California, Berkeley faculty
University of Wisconsin–Madison faculty
University of Chicago faculty
Living people
1964 births
Network scientists